Hugh Elliot or Hugh Elliott may refer to:

 Hugh Elliot (1752–1830), British diplomat and colonial governor
 Hugh Elliot (MP) (1848–1932), British politician
 Hugh S. R. Elliot (1881–1930), British science writer
 Sir Hugh Elliott, 3rd Baronet (1913–1989), British conservationist & ornithologist
 Hugh Elliott (diplomat), British diplomat and UK ambassador to Spain since 2019

See also
 :Hugh Elliott Eaglesham (1873–1938), Canadian physician and politician
 Hugh Elliot Montgomery (* 1948), British-born US physicist